Colin Coates (born 26 October 1985) is a semi-professional footballer from Northern Ireland who plays as a centre-back for Cliftonville.

Early life
Coates was born in Belfast, and attended Grosvenor Grammar School, not traditionally a football-playing school.

Club career

Crusaders
Coates made a name for himself at Crusaders. He later revealed that at 15, he had the choice of signing for either Crusaders or Glentoran. He made his first-team debut against Chimney Corner in the County Antrim Shield on 29 October 2002, and scored on his league debut, a 2–4 defeat to Glentoran on 9 November.

He has developed a formidable partnership in the centre of defence with David Magowan over the years, and he was part of the team which won the Irish Cup in 2009, 
He also scored a late equaliser in normal time in the County Antrim Shield final against Linfield. The Crues went on to win the game 3–2.

Coates was instrumental in Crusaders' triumph in the 2012 Setanta Sports Cup. In the semi-final second leg against Sligo Rovers, he scored an extra-time penalty which put Crusaders into the final. In the final itself against Derry City, he scored twice in a 2–2 draw, and scored in the resulting victorious penalty shoot-out in a man of the match performance. He also scored in the 2012 Irish Cup Final in a 1–4 defeat to Linfield.
Coates has become the highest scoring central defender in Irish league football with his goal against Glentoran in late 2016. His presence in the box, neat finishing and even freekick taking make him an all round player with a great left foot.

Glenavon
After playing 577 senior games for Crusaders, spanning 18 years, Coates signed an 18-month contract with Glenavon on 30 January 2020, with the option for a further year. On 21 June 2021 it was announced that Coates had been transfer listed due to restructuring of the playing staff post COVID-19. On 28 August 2021, it was confirmed that Coates had left the club.

Cliftonville
After his release he signed for Cliftonville.

International career
Coates was called up to the Northern Ireland squad for the match against Italy on 6 June 2009, in which he played the full 90 minutes to receive his first cap.

In May 2010, hew was selected for friendly matches against Turkey and Chile (against both of whom he played as a second-half substitute). He also appeared in a friendly against Morocco. 
As of 11 August 2011, he has received six caps, and is the most capped Crusaders player of all time.

Honours

Club
Crusaders
NIFL Premiership (3): 2014–15, 2015–16, 2017–18 
Irish Cup (2): 2008–09, 2018–19
Setanta Cup (1): 2012
Irish League Cup (1): 2011–12
County Antrim Shield (3): 2009–10, 2017–18, 2018–19
IFA Intermediate League (1): 2005–06
IFA Intermediate League Cup (1): 2005–06
Steel & Sons Cup (1): 2005–06

Cliftonville
Irish League Cup: 2021-22

Individual
Irish League Team of the Year (2): 2008–09, 2009–10

References

Living people
1985 births
Association footballers from Belfast
Association footballers from Northern Ireland
Northern Ireland international footballers
Association football defenders
Crusaders F.C. players
NIFL Premiership players
People educated at Grosvenor Grammar School
Cliftonville F.C. players
 Glenavon F.C. players